Homer Lamar Grice (April 12, 1883 – May 17, 1974) was a college football player, English professor, Baptist preacher and first secretary of the Vacation Bible School Department at the Sunday Schoolboard, Nashville, a position held for nearly 30 years.

Early years
Homer Grice was born on April 12, 1883 in Citra, Florida to Albert Grice and Sarah Lee Bennett.

Mercer University
Grice was a prominent center for the Mercer Baptists football teams of Mercer University. Georgia Tech player and later Hall of Fame coach Bill Alexander called Grice "the meanest and toughest guy I ever ran across on a gridiron."

1911
He was selected second-team All-Southern in 1911, behind Vanderbilt's unanimous selection Hugh Morgan.  Georgia tried to claim Grice was ineligible, to no avail.

Educator

Ouachita Baptist College
Grice was a professor of English literature at Ouachita Baptist College.

Washington High School
Grice coached the football team of Washington High School in Washington, Georgia in 1922 and 1923.

References

1883 births
1974 deaths
American football centers
Mercer Bears football players
High school football coaches in Georgia (U.S. state)
People from Citra, Florida
Players of American football from Florida